The Philippine House Committee on Youth and Sports Development, or House Youth and Sports Development Committee is a standing committee of the Philippine House of Representatives.

Jurisdiction 
As prescribed by House Rules, the committee's jurisdiction is on youth development which includes the following:
 Development of their leadership potentials
 Promotion of their moral, physical, intellectual and social well-being including sports development

Members, 19th Congress

Historical members

18th Congress

Chairperson 
 Eric Martinez (Valenzuela City–2nd, PDP–Laban) July 22, 2019 – October 6, 2020

See also 
 House of Representatives of the Philippines
 List of Philippine House of Representatives committees
 National Youth Commission
 Philippine Sports Commission

References

External links 
House of Representatives of the Philippines

Youth and Sports Development
Youth in the Philippines
Sports in the Philippines